Donavon Frankenreiter (born December 10, 1972) is an American musician and surfer. His debut self-titled album was released in 2004 on Brushfire Records through Universal Music.

Career
Frankenreiter was born in Downey, California, United States. In November 2007, he toured throughout Brazil on the Mostra Alma Surf Festival with bands, Animal Liberation Orchestra, G. Love and Matt Costa, along with Surf Artists Jay Alders, Nathan Gibbs, Céline Chat, Surf Photographer Sean Davey, and Surf Film Maker Sunny Abberton.

An acoustic EP of cover songs called Recycled Recipes landed in 2007, with the polished full-length Pass It Around following in 2008. For the Pass It Around Tour, Donavon teamed up with surf artist and friend, Jay Alders to design a Limited Edition Tour Poster.

In 2010 Frankenreiter left Lost Highway Records, and formed his own label, Liquid Tambourine Records. He subsequently recorded and released his fourth studio album of original material entitled Glow, which was produced by Mark Weinberg.

Discography
With Sunchild
 Mr Jesus (1994)
 Barefoot & Live (1997)
 California Honey (2000)
 The Galaxy Session (2009)

Solo

Extended plays

Video game appearances
Frankenreiter is a playable character in the video game Kelly Slater's Pro Surfer.

References

External links 
 
 

1972 births
Living people
American rock guitarists
American male guitarists
Singer-songwriters from California
American surfers
American rock songwriters
American rock singers
Musicians from Downey, California
Surf musicians
Wrasse Records artists
Lost Highway Records artists
Guitarists from California
21st-century American male singers
21st-century American singers
21st-century American guitarists
American male singer-songwriters